Mathabhanga is a city along Jaldhaka River and a municipality in Cooch Behar district in the Indian state of West Bengal. It is the headquarters of the Mathabhanga subdivision.

Geography

Location
There are two rivers near Mathabhanga. One is Satranga (Sutunga) and the other is Mansai. When the sky is clear (mainly in summer, autumn and spring), the Himalayan range is visible.

According to the District Census Handbook 2011, Koch Bihar, Mathabhanga covered an area of 3.71 km2.

Area overview
The map alongside shows the western part of the district. In Mekhliganj subdivision 9.91% of the population lives in the urban areas and 90.09% lives in the rural areas. In Mathabhanga subdivision 3.67% of the population, the lowest in the district, lives in the urban areas and 96.35% lives in the rural areas. The entire district forms the flat alluvial flood plains of mighty rivers.

Note: The map alongside presents some of the notable locations in the subdivisions. All places marked in the map are linked in the larger full screen map.

Demographics
As per 2011 Census of India Mathabhanga had a total population of 23,890 of which 12,059 (50%) were males and 11,831 (50%) were females. Population in the age range 0–6 years was 2,165. The total number of literate persons in Mathabhanga was 19,571 (90.09% of the population over 6 years).

 India census, Mathabhanga had a population of 21,110. Males constitute 51% of the population and females 49%. Mathabhanga has an average literacy rate of 76%, higher than the national average of 59.5%: male literacy is 81%, and female literacy is 71%. In Mathabhanga, 11% of the population is under 6 years of age.

Civic administration

Police station
Mathabhanga police station has jurisdiction over Mathabhanga municipal area and Mathabhanga I CD block.

Transport
The Mathabhanga Railway Station lies on the New Mal-Changrabandha-New Cooch Behar line.

Education
Mathabhanga College was established in 1969 at Mathabhanga. Affiliated with the  Cooch Behar Panchanan Barma University, it offers honours courses in Bengali, English, Sanskrit, political science, history, geography, philosophy, economics, physics, chemistry, mathematics and accounting and general courses in arts, science and commerce.

Healthcare
Mathabhanga Subdivisional Hospital at Mathabhanga functions with 120 beds.

References

Cities and towns in Cooch Behar district
Cities in West Bengal